Eliana Gil (born 24 April 1948), is a lecturer, writer, and clinician of marriage, family and child. She is on the board of a number of professional counselling organizations that use play and art therapies, and she is the former president of the Association for Play Therapy (APT).

Gil is the senior partner of the Gil Institute for Trauma Recovery and Education in Fairfax, Virginia. She is also the director of Starbright Training Institute for Child and Family Play Therapy based in northern Virginia.

Early life 
Eliana Gil is originally from Guayaquil, Ecuador. Gil's parents, Manuel and Eugenia, were both born in Ecuador. When Gil was 14 the family moved to Washington, DC. After high school the family moved again to San Francisco.

Education 
Gil attended the California Graduate School of Family Psychology in San Rafael where she gained her doctorate in family therapy. She did her Art Therapy training at George Washington University. She went on be a registered Play Therapy Supervisor, a registered Art Therapist, and a licensed Marriage, Family, Child Counselor.

Early career 
Gil has worked in the field of child abuse prevention and treatment since 1973. Gil worked as a Marriage, Family and Child Counselor (MFCC) in California and then moved to the East Coast where she became a Licensed Marriage and Family Therapist (LMFT) in Virginia. She went on to work for the San Francisco Child Abuse Council initially as a secretary, then as an Administrative Assistant, an Assistant Director and finally, as a Director of two programs in Contra Costa County: The Costa County Child Abuse Council and Gil and Associates.

Gil then moved first to Maryland and worked with Children's Mental Health, and then moved again to work at the Inova Kellar Center and Childhelp Children's Center in Virginia.

Later career 
Gil is the senior partner of the Gil Institute for Trauma Recovery and Education in Fairfax, Virginia which provides therapy, consulting, and training services. Her partner in the private practice is Myriam Goldin.

The Institute includes the Starbright Training Institute for Child and Family Play Therapy, where Gil acts as director, provides training sessions on family play therapy and specialized therapy for youths who have experienced childhood trauma.

She has written widely on the subject of child abuse, family play therapy, culturally informed play therapy, and related topics, and produced a series of educational videotapes in the area of psychotherapy.

Other roles she has held include working as an adjunct faculty member at Virginia Tech’s Family Therapy Department. She has also served on the board of directors of the American Professional Society on the Abuse of Children and the National Resource Center on Child Sexual Abuse. Gil is also a former president of the Association for Play Therapy.

As media consultant 
Gil has been consulted by a number of media outlets over the years including the San Francisco Chronicle and KCET.

Interviews 
Timothy Dwyer interviewed Gil as part of an article in 2001 for the Journal of Clinical Activities, Assignments & Handouts in Psychotherapy Practice. The article also featured interviews with Richard C. Schwartz and Bill O'Hanlon.

Gil was also interviewed at the end of 2013 by Catherine Ford Sori and Sheryl Schnur for The Family Journal. The interview was printed in two parts, part I in January 2014, and part II in April 2014.

Personal life 
In 2014 Gil announced that she would be relocating to Florida and make use of technology to reduce her clinical work and travel schedule. The change was to enable her to focus on her 96-year-old mother.

Gil has four grandchildren and her hobbies include playing tennis.

Bibliography

Books

Chapters in books

Journal articles

References

External links 
 Eliana Gil's official website
 Gil Institute for Trauma Recovery and Education official website
 Starbright Training Institute official website

1948 births
George Washington University alumni
Art therapists
Family therapists
Child psychologists
Living people